The American Optometric Association (AOA), founded in 1898, represents approximately 37,000 doctors of optometry, optometry students and para-optometric assistants and technicians in the United States.

Overview
The AOA states that:
 The American Optometric Association represents approximately 39,000 doctors of optometry, optometry students and paraoptometric assistants and technicians. Optometrists serve patients in nearly 6,500 communities across the country, and in 3,500 of those communities are the only eye doctors. Doctors of optometry provide two-thirds of all primary eye care in the United States.
 
 Founded in 1898, the AOA is a federation of state, student and armed forces optometric associations. Through these affiliations, the AOA serves members consisting of optometrists, students of optometry, paraoptometric assistants and technicians.
 
 Together, the AOA and its affiliates work to provide the public with quality vision and eye care.

The AOA has offices in St. Louis, Missouri (the headquarters) and Alexandria, Virginia, employing approximately 100 people. The Association also has four special interest sections: The Contact Lens and Cornea Section, the Vision Rehabilitation Section, the Sports Vision Section and the Paraoptometric Section.

The AOA and its affiliates work to provide the public with quality vision and eye care by:
Setting professional standards and helping member optometrists conduct patient care efficiently and effectively,
Lobbying government and other organizations on behalf of the optometric profession, and
Providing research and education leadership.

AOA mission
"Advocate for the profession and serve optometrists in meeting the eye care needs of the public."

The objectives of AOA are centered on improving the quality and availability of eye and vision care. The AOA fulfills its missions in accordance with the following goals:

 Health care and public policy related to eye care will uniformly recognize optometrists as primary health care providers and ensure the public has access to the full scope of optometric care.
 Optometrists and other professionals will look to the American Optometric Association for professional standards, research and education leadership which serve to enhance and ensure competent, quality patient care.
 The public, optometrists and other professionals will turn to the American Optometric Association for reliable and current information related to optometry, eye care, and health care policy.

Journal
The AOA had its own journal, called Optometry – Journal of the American Optometric Association, published by Elsevier until 2012. It currently publishes relevant articles under the News section of their website.

Colocation
In 2015, the World Council of Optometry (WCO) relocated to the AOA headquarters in St Louis.

See also
 European Academy of Optometry and Optics
 World Council of Optometry

References

External links
 
 AOA News website
 Optometry's Meeting website
 Journal of the American Optometric Association

1898 establishments in the United States
Organizations established in 1898
Non-profit organizations based in St. Louis
Medical associations based in the United States
Eye care in the United States
Medical and health organizations based in Missouri